Ricangel Emilio de Leça (born 1 August 1981) is an Aruban football referee and former player. He became a FIFA List referee in 2015.

Before becoming an international referee, de Leça played as a defender for the Aruba national team, and Aruban clubs SV La Fama and SV Dakota.

References

External links

1981 births
Living people
Aruban football referees
CONCACAF Champions League referees
Aruban footballers
Association football defenders
Aruba international footballers